Nihualac Channel is a body of water in the Chonos Archipelago separating James and Teresa islands in the north from Melchor and Kent islands in the south. The channel has a SWW-NEE orientation. On its western end, it reaches the open Pacific Ocean while on its eastern end it connects with the north–south Moraleda Channel.

References

Bodies of water of Aysén Region
Chonos Archipelago
Straits of Chile